Zanagu or Zangu may refer to:

 Zanagu, South Khorasan
 Zangu, West Azerbaijan

See also
 Zanguiyeh (disambiguation)